1987 general election may refer to:

1987 Belgian general election
1987 Ethiopian general election
1987 Fijian general election
1987 Gambian general election
1987 Irish general election
1987 Italian general election
1987 Malawian general election
1987 Maltese general election
1987 Mauritian general election
1987 Montserratian general election
1987 New Zealand general election
1987 Papua New Guinean general election
1987 South African general election
1987 Tongan general election
1987 Turkish general election
1987 United Kingdom general election
1987 Vanuatuan general election